Evant is a Tivoid language of Nigeria.

References

Languages of Nigeria
Languages of Cameroon
Tivoid languages